Penghargaan Yap Thiam Hien (Yap Thiam Hien Award) is an award given by Yayasan Pusat Studi Hak Asasi Manusia to people with contributions in human rights issues in Indonesia. The name is based on an Indonesian Chinese lawyer and a human right activist Yap Thiam Hien. The award is usually given every 10 December since 1992. However, due to lack of funding, the foundation stopped giving out the award in 2005.

Winners

 1992 — Haji Muhidin, Jhony Simanjuntak dan H.J.C. Princen
 1993 — Marsinah
 1994 — Trimoelja D. Soerjadi
 1995 — Jenggawah dan Ade Rostina Sitompul
 1996 — Sandyawan Sumardi S.J
 1997 — (No award)
 1998 — Kontras dan Farida Hariyani
 1999 — Sarah Lery Mboeik and Mama Yosepha Alomang
 2000 — The Urban Poor Consortium
 2001 — Suraiya Kamaruzaman and Ester Jusuf Purba
 2002 — Widji Thukul
 2003 — Maria Margaretha Hartiningsih
 2004 — Maria Catarina Sumarsih
 2005 — (No award)
 2006 — (No award)
 2007 — (No award)
 2008 — Siti Musdah Mulia
 2009 — Yohanes Jonga
 2010 — Asmara Nababan
 2011 — Soetandyo Wignjosoebroto 
 2012 — Majalah Tempo
 2014 — Anis Hidayah
 2015 — 	Handoko Wibowo
 2016 — 	Aleta Baun
 2017 —Ahmad Mustofa Bisri, known as Gus Mus
 2018 — 	Eva Bande and a local group from Central Java, Sedulur Sikep

References 

Indonesian awards
Human rights awards